Schinia tobia is a moth of the family Noctuidae. It is in North America, including Arizona, California and New Mexico.

The wingspan is about 23 mm.

The larvae feed on Dicoria canescens.

External links
Images
Butterflies and Moths of North America

Schinia
Moths of North America
Moths described in 1906